The 1945–46 season was the Detroit Red Wings' 19th season of operation. The season saw the Wings achieve a record of 31-14-5, finishing second in the National Hockey League (NHL), qualifying the team for the playoffs. The coach and general manager was Jack Adams, with Flash Hollett serving as the team's captain.

Regular season
Flash Hollett became the first defenceman to score twenty goals in one season. The record would stand until Bobby Orr broke it several decades later.

Final standings

Record vs. opponents

Schedule and results

Player statistics

Regular season
Scoring

Goaltending

Playoffs
Scoring

Goaltending

Note: GP = Games played; G = Goals; A = Assists; Pts = Points; +/- = Plus-minus PIM = Penalty minutes; PPG = Power-play goals; SHG = Short-handed goals; GWG = Game-winning goals;
      MIN = Minutes played; W = Wins; L = Losses; T = Ties; GA = Goals against; GAA = Goals-against average;  SO = Shutouts;

See also
1944–45 NHL season

References

External links
 

Detroit
Detroit
Detroit Red Wings seasons
Detroit Red Wings
Detroit Red Wings